John Pancras Mukasa Lubowa Ssebuwufu, commonly known as John Ssebuwufu is a Ugandan chemist, academic and administrator. He is a former chancellor of Kyambogo University, Uganda's second-largest public university serving between 2014-2022 having served for 2 terms. He was installed as chancellor on 19 February 2014, replacing Eric Tiyo Adriko, who had completed his two term tenure. The correct spelling of his last name is Ssebuwufu. However the literature contains many instances where the name is spelled with a single "s".

Background
He was born in Uganda's Central Region in 1947.

Education
Ssebuwufu attended Namilyango College for his middle and high school education in the 1960s. He studied at Makerere University, for his Bachelor of Science and Master of Science degrees, both in Chemistry. In 1974, he won a scholarship to study for a Doctor of Philosophy at Queen's University Belfast in Northern Ireland, from which he graduated in 1977. Ssebuwufu spent another two years at Queen's University on a postdoctoral fellowship also in chemistry.

Work experience
On returning to Uganda in 1979, Ssebuwufu was appointed as lecturer in the Department of Chemistry at Makerere University. He continued in that position until 1985, when he was promoted to senior lecturer. In 1987, he became the head of the Chemistry Department at the university.

In 1990, he was elevated to the rank of professor and was appointed principal of the Institute of Teacher Education; now part of Kyambogo University. He served in that capacity until 1993 when he was appointed vice chancellor of Makerere University, Uganda's oldest and largest public university. He served as vice chancellor until the expiration of his tenure in 2004. In February 2014, the President of Uganda appointed him chancellor of Kyambogo University.

Other responsibilities
In addition to his responsibilities at Kyambogo University, Ssebuwufu is the current Vice Chancellor of the University of Kisubi (UniK) which was formerly known as 'Kisubi Brothers University College'' (KBUC), a constituent college of Uganda Martyrs Universityto which he had also served as the Principal. In 2013, he was appointed as the chairperson of the UbuntuNet Alliance, the regional research and education network for Eastern and Southern Africa. In the past, he has served as the director of research programs at the Association of African Universities (AAU) in Ghana.

Ssebuwufu is a member of the World Bank Millennium Science Initiative and is one of the technical experts for Uganda. He serves as the chairman of the board of directors for following Ugandan companies and businesses:

 Citibank Uganda - A subsidiary of Citigroup of New York City
 Uganda Management Institute (UMI)
 National Environment Management Authority of Uganda (NEMA)
 National Council for Science and Technology

See also
 Education in Uganda
 Ugandan university leaders
 List of universities in Uganda

References

Succession table as vice chancellor of Makerere University

Succession table as chancellor of Kyambogo University

External links
Website of Kyambogo University
Website of Makerere University
Website of Uganda Martyrs University
Search For New Kyambogo University Chancellor

1947 births
Living people
Ganda people
Vice-chancellors of universities in Uganda
Ugandan chemists
Alumni of Queen's University Belfast
Makerere University alumni
People educated at Namilyango College
Academic staff of Kyambogo University
Ugandan Roman Catholics
Fellows of Uganda National Academy of Sciences